Tumiso Macdonald Rakgare is a Motswana politician serving as the Minister of Youth Empowerment, Sport and Culture Development.

References 

Living people
Year of birth missing (living people)
Members of the National Assembly (Botswana)
Botswana Democratic Party politicians
People from Gaborone